The 1936 season was Wisła Krakóws 28th year as a club.

Friendlies

Ekstraklasa

Squad, appearances and goals

|-
|}

Goalscorers

External links
1936 Wisła Kraków season at historiawisly.pl

Wisła Kraków seasons
Polish football clubs 1936 season
Wisla